Emerald Towers is a project consisting of three office towers of 54, 43 and 37 floors in Astana, Kazakhstan. They were the tallest building in Astana until the completion of the Abu Dhabi Plaza. The project was completed in 2010.

External links
emporis.com

Skyscrapers in Kazakhstan
Buildings and structures under construction in Kazakhstan
Skyscraper office buildings